Lansbergia is a genus of beetles in the family Scarabaeidae; authorities place it in either the tribe Goliathini or Xiphoscelidini.

Species  
Lansbergia albonotata
Lansbergia bouyeri
Lansbergia sordida
Lansbergia vanderkelleni

References 

Cetoniinae